is a puzzle video game developed by Sonic Team and published by Sega. It is a direct sequel to Puyo Puyo Tetris. The game was released for Nintendo Switch, PlayStation 4, PlayStation 5, Xbox One, and Xbox Series X/S on December 8, 2020 with a Windows version released on March 21, 2021. The game released to generally positive reviews.

Gameplay

Like the previous game, Puyo Puyo Tetris 2 revolves around the two different gameplay styles of the Puyo Puyo and Tetris series respectively. Players can choose between Puyo style, which involves arranging colored blobs (puyos) and matching them together to set off combo chains, and Tetris style, which involves placing shaped blocks (tetriminos) to create lines and removing them from the grid. Players compete against each other with the style of their choosing, with the aim of sending garbage to their opponents, causing their play field to overflow and eliminating them. The game features all the modes featured in the original Puyo Puyo Tetris, including the Swap and Fusion modes which feature both styles.

In addition to a new story and characters, the game introduces new modes, such as Skill battles which allow for character based skills and items to quickly change the game. It was also stated to have an improved online mode from the first game, allowing for more competition in leagues and free play, as well as new modes. In Adventure mode, the player will traverse an overworld and engage in Skill Battles with other characters in the story, that acts more like a JRPG.

Story 
After the events of the first game, the worlds of Puyo and Tetris are separated once more, leading to all of the characters forgetting the memories they gained from their previous adventure. Strangely, the two puzzle worlds merge once more, seemingly caused by a brand new character, Marle. Ringo first encounters Tee and his crew in Suzuran, who are encouraged to pursue the mysterious force by the Keeper of Dimensions, Ex.

After Ringo gathers Amitie, Arle Nadja, and Carbuncle the characters are introduced to the S.S Tetra's crew, they pursue Marle. Eventually, they learn that she had brainwashed many of the citizens of Primp Town into constantly desiring to battle. Through the act of battling, Tee's crew and Ringo's friends free the citizens from Marle's spell and eventually find and defeat her.

Marle reveals that she herself had been under the control of another new character, Squares. The cast of characters travel aboard the S.S Tetra to ask for Ex's guidance, who creates a path of various riddles to help Marle recall the circumstances surrounding the merging of worlds and Squares. After regaining her memories, Marle explains that she is the human incarnation of the Will of the Worlds, and that Squares was created by her to focus on maintaining the order of the world.

The group of friends travel to the edge of the two worlds and face off against Squares, who wishes to destroy both worlds entirely due to their merging disrupting the natural order. As they battle Squares, Marle comes to the realization that Squares has the mentality of an infant despite his older appearance and voice. Marle calms Squares, and the group help quell the power he had progressively gained over the course of the adventure. After saying their sentimental goodbyes, the worlds separate once more.

Development and release
On August 26, 2020 during a Nintendo Direct Mini presentation, the game was showcased and was slated for December 2020 for Nintendo Switch. Later that day, it was discovered that the game would be released on December 8, 2020 alongside PlayStation 4, Xbox One, and Xbox Series X/S versions with the Japanese version releasing two days later. A PlayStation 5 version was also announced and would release during 'Holiday 2020', later revealed to be the same day as the other versions. A Windows version on Steam was said to be released on March 23, 2021.

An update in January 2021 added four additional playable characters including Sonic the Hedgehog from the series of the same name. In a second update, released in February 2021, four new characters were added from Puyo Puyo 2, the Puyo Pop Fever games, and Puyo Puyo Chronicle. Accessibility options for color blind players were added, alongside three new songs and multiplayer support for certain modes previously only playable in single-player. New challenge rules were also added. In March 2021, the final update was released, adding four characters from the Puyo Puyo series, the ability for PlayStation 4 and PlayStation 5 players to participate in online play together, four additional songs, a spectator mode, allowing players to watch online matches, and a harder "Super Spicy" difficulty setting, in addition to also adding twenty new user avatar pictures.

Reception

The game received “generally favorable reviews” according to review aggregator Metacritic.

Notes

References

External links
 

2020 video games
Crossover video games
Nintendo Switch games
PlayStation 4 games
PlayStation 5 games
Xbox Series X and Series S games
Xbox One games
Windows games
Puyo Puyo
Tetris
Sonic Team games
Sega video games
Puzzle video games
Video games developed in Japan
Multiplayer and single-player video games